Telecom Egypt Sporting Club, is an Egyptian football club based in Cairo, Egypt. The club is currently playing in the Egyptian Second Division, the second-highest league in the Egyptian football league system. Telecom Egypt is the club affiliated to Telecom Egypt company, which is known in Egypt with its Arabic transliteration El Masreya lel Etesalat.

The club became known after its top performances in the Egyptian Second Division, and later rose to fame for the first time after being promoted to the Egyptian Premier League in season 2007–08.

In season 2008–09 the club attracted much attention after they signed a contract with the retired legendary Egyptian player Hossam Hassan to coach the team. At the time of the signing the club was highly threatened of relegation, and Hossam's main objective was to maintain the club's stance in the Egyptian Premier League, the same way he did with El-Masry, the club he coached the past season. However, and after many extraordinary performances against Egyptian top club, Itesalat club was relegated to the Egyptian Second Division in circumstances that are considered controversial.

Current squad 

Football clubs in Cairo
2006 establishments in Egypt
Works association football clubs in Egypt